Myohalovirus (synonym: PhiH-like viruses, Phihlikevirus) is a genus of viruses in the order Caudovirales, in the family Myoviridae. Bacteria and  archaea serve as natural hosts. There are three species in this genus.

Taxonomy
The following three species are assigned to the genus:
 Halobacterium virus ChaoS9
 Halobacterium virus phiH
 Natrialba virus PhiCh1

Structure
Myohaloviruses are nonenveloped, with a head and tail. The head is icosahedral with a diameter of about 64 nm. The tail is around 170  nm long, 18 nm wide, has short terminal fibers, and is contractile.

Genome
Genomes are circular, around 59kb in length. The genome codes for 100 proteins.

Life cycle
Viral replication is cytoplasmic. The virus attaches to the host cell using its terminal fibers, and ejects the viral DNA into the host cytoplasm via contraction of its tail sheath. DNA-templated transcription is the method of transcription. Once the viral genes have been replicated, the procapsid is assembled and packed. The tail is then assembled and the mature virions are released via lysis. Bacteria and archaea serve as the natural host. Transmission routes are passive diffusion.

History
According to the ICTV's 1997 report, the genus PhiH-like viruses was first accepted as a new genus in the family Myoviridae, at the same time as its type species. This proposal is available here. The following year (1998), the genus was added to the newly created order Caudovirales. In 1999, a name change is reported, but no change actually occurred. In 2012, the name was changed to Phihlikevirus. This proposal is available here. The genus was later renamed to ''Myohalovirus'.

References

External links
 Viralzone: Phihlikevirus
 ICTV

Myoviridae
Virus genera